Isaac Okoronkwo (born 1 May 1978) is a Nigerian former professional football player who played as a defender.

Career
Okoronkwo started his career at FC Lagos before moving to the Nigerian club Julius Berger. His first club outside Nigeria was a six-month spell at Al-Rayyan in Qatar, but the club could not afford to keep him beyond this period and he returned home to Iwuanyanwu Nationale. He spent one season there before again heading abroad with Moldovan club Sheriff Tiraspol for two seasons. In the summer of 2000, he signed for Shakhtar Donetsk in the Ukraine.

With Shakhtar he played in the UEFA Champions League and UEFA Cup, and won the Ukrainian Cup in 2001 and the league title in 2002. After his contract expired in 2003, several Premier League and Bundesliga clubs like Schalke 04 and Borussia Mönchengladbach tried to sign him. He eventually signed a one-year deal with newly promoted Premier League side Wolverhampton Wanderers. Okoronkwo's time in England did not prove a success though as he was unable to break into the team until the closing months of the season, by which time the club faced almost certain relegation. After they suffered the drop, Okoronkwo was released and eventually moved to play in Russia with Alania Vladikavkaz. Alania folded under financial problems in 2005 and he signed with FC Moscow in 2006, soon becoming an important member of the starting line-up at his new club. That season he was voted the club's player of the season, alongside Hector Bracamonte.

International career
Okoronkwo played 25 games for the Nigeria national team after making his debut on 13 January 2001, against Zambia. He played in the 2002 and 2004 African Cup of Nations (finishing third both times) and in the Olympic Games in 2000. He also played in every minute of Nigeria's 2002 World Cup campaign, where they failed to progress beyond the group stage.

Honors
Nigeria
Africa Cup of Nations third place:2004

References

External links
 Profile at Nigerian Players.com

1978 births
Living people
Nigerian footballers
Nigerian expatriate footballers
FC Sheriff Tiraspol players
FC Shakhtar Donetsk players
Wolverhampton Wanderers F.C. players
FC Spartak Vladikavkaz players
FC Moscow players
Ukrainian Premier League players
Premier League players
Nigerian expatriate sportspeople in Russia
2002 African Cup of Nations players
2004 African Cup of Nations players
2002 FIFA World Cup players
Igbo sportspeople
Footballers at the 2000 Summer Olympics
Olympic footballers of Nigeria
Nigeria international footballers
Nigerian expatriate sportspeople in Moldova
Russian Premier League players
Enyimba F.C. players
Al-Rayyan SC players
Expatriate footballers in Russia
Expatriate footballers in Qatar
Heartland F.C. players
Expatriate footballers in Moldova
Expatriate footballers in Ukraine
Nigerian expatriate sportspeople in Ukraine
Expatriate footballers in England
FC Rostov players
Association football defenders
Qatar Stars League players